was a Japanese film actor.

Career
Born in Hiroshima Prefecture, Nakano attended Hōsei University, but left before graduating. When he was playing for the Nikkatsu amateur baseball team, he was scouted as an actor and made his debut in 1925 in Daichi wa hohoemu. While becoming one of Japan's main romantic leads, Nakano moved from Nikkatsu to Teikoku Kinema to Shinkō Kinema to Daiichi Eiga and other studios, and starred in films directed by such masters as Kenji Mizoguchi, Tomu Uchida, Daisuke Itō, and Tomotaka Tasaka, among others. In 1941, he formed his own production company, Nakano Eiji Productions, and directed the film Shōgun. After World War II, he ceased appearing in movies until the 1970s, when he appeared in films such as Kaneto Shindo's documentary on Kenji Mizoguchi, Kenji Mizoguchi: The Life of a Film Director.

Selected filmography

Daichi wa hohoemu (1925)
Orizuru Osen (1935)
Shōgun (1941) (director)
Kenji Mizoguchi: The Life of a Film Director (1975)

References

External links
 
 

Japanese male silent film actors
1904 births
1990 deaths
People from Kure, Hiroshima
20th-century Japanese male actors